Surrender is a 1950 American Western film directed by Allan Dwan, written by James Edward Grant and Sloan Nibley, and starring Vera Ralston, John Carroll, Walter Brennan, Francis Lederer, William Ching, Maria Palmer and Jane Darwell. It was released on September 15, 1950, by Republic Pictures.

Plot
With her husband Henry Vaan in a Texas jail, sultry Violet Barton joins her sister Janet in a border town called La Mirada, where she seduces wealthy newspaperman Johnny Hale into marrying her. Johnny is unaware Violet is a bigamist or that Janet was in love with him.

Johnny's best friend, gambler Gregg Delaney, had been the object of Violet's affections at first before she discovered Johnny was rich. Vaan gets out of jail and tracks Violet down, threatening her with blackmail unless her new husband pays him. Vaan is murdered by Violet, who lets Johnny take the rap. Sheriff Bill Howard places him under arrest.

Johnny and Gregg each suspect the other of killing Vaan, not realizing it was Violet all along. Gregg helps spring Johnny from jail, then flees with Violet after she finally confesses to her various sins. Howard and his posse pursue the fugitives and kill them both.

Cast

References

External links 
 

1950 films
American Western (genre) films
1950 Western (genre) films
Republic Pictures films
Films directed by Allan Dwan
Films scored by Nathan Scott
American black-and-white films
1950s English-language films
1950s American films